Meleager of Macedonia (Greek: Μελέαγρος) was the brother of Ptolemy Keraunos and son of Ptolemy I Soter and Eurydice. Meleager ruled as King of Macedonia during 279 BC for two months until he was compelled by his Macedonian troops to resign his crown.

Citations

References
 

Monarchs who abdicated
3rd-century BC Macedonian monarchs
Ancient Macedonian monarchs
3rd-century BC rulers
Non-dynastic kings of Macedonia (ancient kingdom)
Hellenistic Macedonia
Ptolemaic dynasty